David Michael Conner (born May 6, 1978) is a Washington, D.C.-based writer who specializes in music and celebrity, LGBT and health-related issues with a focus on Lyme disease.  Among the notable personalities Conner has interviewed are Tori Amos for Geek Monthly magazine and The Huffington Post, Sara Bareilles and Dustin Lance Black for The Huffington Post, Kathy Griffin, Jewel Kilcher, Mandy Moore, Sarah McLachlan, Nick Carter and LeToya Luckett for The Advocate,

, Vanessa L. Williams, Maurice Benard, Cherien Dabis and Dmitry Lipkin for the Entertainment Industries Council.

Personal 
Conner is an artist and writer from Washington, D.C. He has a Master of Fine Arts in creative writing and a Bachelor of Arts in English with a concentration in film and media studies, both from George Mason University in Fairfax, Virginia. In addition to entertainment writing, Conner writes fiction and paints, mainly in acrylic and watercolor media.  In 2011, Conner became a regular contributor to The Advocate magazine as an opinion editorial commentator on LGBT social issues based upon his personal experiences and perspective, beginning with a controversial commentary on the It Gets Better Project.  In 2015, Conner began writing a blog for The Huffington Post that features interviews with celebrities and commentary on LGBT issues and the complexities of Lyme and associated diseases.  On December 24, 2015, The Guardian published a widely read op-ed by Conner discussing life with Lyme disease and advocating improved patient care for patients who live with chronic illness.

Selected commentaries and interviews 
 Subject: Health Lyme disease Amyotrophic lateral sclerosis.
 Subject: Health Lyme disease Amyotrophic lateral sclerosis Multiple sclerosis Op-ed.
 Subject: Health Lyme disease Andy Cohen Real Housewives of Beverly Hills Op-ed Bravo (U.S. TV network).
 Subject: Health Lyme disease Andy Cohen Real Housewives of Beverly Hills Op-ed Bravo (U.S. TV network).
 Subject: Health Lyme disease Op-ed.
 Subject: LGBT Bullying Op-ed.
 Subject: Health Lyme disease Mental illness Op-ed.
 Subject: Health Lyme disease Mental illness Op-ed.
 Subject: Paris Politics Terrorism Op-ed.
 Subject: Health Lyme disease HIV/AIDS Op-ed.
 Subject: Health Lyme disease HIV/AIDS Op-ed LGBT.
 Subject: Entertainment LGBT Dustin Lance Black Interview.
 Subject: Tori Amos Entertainment Music Interview Musical theatre The Light Princess
 Subject: LGBT Op-ed Entertainment.
 Subject: LGBT Op-ed.
 Subject: LGBT Op-ed.
 Subject: Singer Sarah McLachlan.
 Subject: Singer Nick Carter.
 Subject: Comedian Kathy Griffin.
 Subject: Singer LeToya Luckett.
 Subject: Singer/Actress Mandy Moore.
 Subject: Singer/Songwriter Jewel Kilcher.
 Subject: Singer Britney Spears.
 Subject: Singer/Songwriter/Author Tori Amos.

References 

Living people
American gay writers
American LGBT journalists
1978 births
21st-century LGBT people